Helastia mutabilis is a species of moth of the family Geometridae. It is endemic to New Zealand, where it is known from both the North and South Islands.

The length of the forewings is 9.5-13.1 mm. The forewings are triangular with a brownish white to grey coloration and brown to dark brown wavy transverse lines.

The larvae feed on moss species of the genus Racomitrion.

References

Larentiinae
Moths of New Zealand
Endemic fauna of New Zealand
Moths described in 1987
Endemic moths of New Zealand